Randolph House, also known as Laurel Hill Mansion, is a historic mansion in east Fairmount Park, Philadelphia, Pennsylvania.

History 
There are conflicting histories about the origins of the home. Some sources claim that it was built by Joseph Shute in 1748 after which it was purchased by Francis Rawle for use as his family's summer retreat. Other sources, including the organization that manages the home, state that the land where the house sits was purchased by Francis Rawle in 1760 and, after Rawle was killed in a shooting accident in 1761, his wife, Rebecca, proceeded with plans to build Laurel Hill.  Francis and Rebecca had three children together; Anna, William, and Margaret.

Rebecca married Samuel Shoemaker who would later become mayor of Philadelphia. The Shoemakers retained multiple residences including Laurel Hill. Samuel Shoemaker was a British Loyalist and fled to England to avoid arrest. Laurel Hill was seized and sold at auction.

Major James Parr purchased the home and leased it to French Prime Minister, the Chevalier de la Luzern.

Rebecca was able to reclaim the home by 1791. Rebecca died in 1819 and her son, William, inherited the home. William sold the home to Philadelphia surgeon Dr. Philip Syng Physick. Physick's daughter, Sally Randolph, inherited the house upon his death, at which time it became known as the Randolph Mansion, or Randolph House.

The house was renamed Laurel Hill Mansion in 1976 by the City of Philadelphia during the United States Bicentennial.

Style 
The central portion of the house was built around 1767 in the Georgian style and expanded in the early 19th century with a one-story addition on the south side. The octagonally-shaped Federal style addition on the north side was built in 1846.

The house was added to the National Register of Historic Places on March 24, 1972.

Present day 
Laurel Hill Mansion is managed by the nonprofit organization, Women for Greater Philadelphia, Inc.. The organization hosts social and fundraising events at the home.

See also 
 List of houses in Fairmount Park
 National Register of Historic Places listings in North Philadelphia

References

External links

Randolph at the Historical Society of Philadelphia

Houses on the National Register of Historic Places in Philadelphia
Georgian architecture in Pennsylvania
Houses completed in 1750
Houses in Fairmount Park
Historic house museums in Philadelphia
Philadelphia Register of Historic Places
Federal architecture in Pennsylvania
Historic American Buildings Survey in Philadelphia
East Fairmount Park